Phototrophic may refer to:
 Phototroph type plants and bacteria
 "Phototrophic" by desert rock band Kyuss from their album ...And the Circus Leaves Town